Joan Gaspart i Solves (born 11 October 1944) is a Spanish businessman and a former FC Barcelona president between July 2000 and February 2003. He was born in Barcelona. He was vice president of the club during the presidency of Josep Lluís Nuñez between 1978 and 2000, before becoming president himself. He was heavily criticised for his presidency that lasted from 2000 to 2003, and also labelled himself as a poor president of the club. Gaspart spent the money from the sale of Luís Figo to Real Madrid, by buying Emmanuel Petit and Marc Overmars from Arsenal and Gerard from Valencia.

Gaspart stepped down as president of FC Barcelona in 2003 with the club's football two points off relegation.

From 2004 to 2011 he was president of football club UE Sant Andreu from Barcelona. In 2017, he became vice president of the Royal Spanish Football Federation (RFEF), and was responsible for Ángel María Villar's electoral campaign. Villar was president of the Royal Spanish Football Federation from 1988 to 2017, and vice president of both UEFA and FIFA.

References

External links
 Gaspart at FC Barcelona website

1944 births
Living people
FC Barcelona presidents
Businesspeople from Catalonia